The list of asteroid-discovering observatories contains a section for each observatory which has discovered one or more asteroids, along with a list of those asteroids.

For each numbered asteroid, the Minor Planet Center lists one or more discoverers who have been given credit for the discovery.  Sometimes these are individuals (by modern rules there can be no more than three co-discoverers), and sometimes the credit is given to an organization (for instance, Purple Mountain Observatory).

Observatories

Andrushivka Astronomical Observatory 
It is a private observatory near Andrushivka in Zhytomyr oblast, Ukraine. The observatory has IAU observatory code A50.

It has discovered the following asteroids:

Bohyunsan Optical Astronomy Observatory 

The Korean Bohyunsan Optical Astronomy Observatory (BOAO), located at Mount Bohyeon near the city of Yeongcheon, is a member of the East-Asian Planet Search Network, an international collaboration between Korea, China and Japan. Each facility, BOAO (Korea), Xinglong Station (NAOC) (China), and Okayama Astrophysical Observatory (Japan), has a 2 m class telescope, a high dispersion echelle spectrograph, and an iodine absorption cell for precise RV measurements, looking for extrasolar planets.

It has discovered the following asteroids:

Cerro El Roble Astronomical Station 

Between 1968 and 1982, Carlos Torres discovered or co-discovered with S. Cofré and others a number of asteroids from the Chilean Cerro El Roble Station. It has discovered the following asteroids:

Chichibu Observatory 
This is the private observatory of Naoto Sato in Chichibu, Saitama, Japan. This Observatory has IAU observatory code 369.

It has discovered the following asteroids:

6991 Chichibu
7038 Tokorozawa
7851 Azumino
8581 Johnen
8924 Iruma
8933 Kurobe
9230 Yasuda
9418 Mayumi
10224 Hisashi
10880 Kaguya
10916 Okina-Ouna
11114
11607
12027 Masaakitanaka
12031 Kobaton
12432 Usuda
12456 Genichiaraki
12460 Mando
12469 Katsuura
13188 Okinawa
13654 Masuda
13694
15884 Maspalomas
15916 Shigeoyamada
16716
16723 Fumiofuke
16790 Yuuzou
16796 Shinji
16826 Daisuke
16853 Masafumi
17612 Whiteknight
17656 Hayabusa
17657 Himawari
17666
18469 Hakodate
18488
18520 Wolfratshausen
18553 Kinkakuji
20193 Yakushima,
21250 Kamikouchi
21302 Shirakamisanchi
21348 Toyoteru
22470 Shirakawa-go
23586
23628 Ichimura
23630
23638 Nagano
23649 Tohoku
23963
25302 Niim
26223 Enari
26224
26902
26990 Culbertson
26998 Iriso
27918 Azusagawa
27982 Atsushimiyazaki
27991 Koheijimiura
27997 Bandos
28173 Hisakichi
28174 Harue
29420 Ikuo
29421
29514 Karatsu
29644
31075
31083
31084
31087 Oirase
31095 Buneiou
31179 Gongju
31199
32984
32990 Sayo-hime
32998
33070
33088
33096
35322
35400
35401
37743
37746
39818
43919
43949
44012
48734
52479
52546
52550
52623
52629
53019
55883
58410
58613
58614
58619
58620
58662
58667
65838
69411
69482
69486
69490
69562
73867
73968
90880
90883
90951
90955
90982
96319
96321
96368
96369
96372
100389
100499
100689
100703
101431
118230 Sado
120665
120741 Iijimayuichi
120974
129600
136743 Echigo
136790
160025
162144
164696
175768
192452
200141
210489
251709
269706
297291
336762

Dynic Astronomical Observatory 

It has discovered the following asteroids:

Emerald Lane Observatory 

It has discovered the following asteroids:

Fair Oaks Ranch Observatory 

It has discovered the following asteroids:

Geisei Observatory 

Tsutomu Seki is the director of the Geisei Observatory in Geisei, Kōchi, Japan.

It has discovered the following asteroids:

Jurassien-Vicques Observatory 

It has discovered the following asteroids:

Kingsnake Observatory 

It has discovered the following asteroids:

Kitami Observatory 

It has discovered the following asteroids:

Lime Creek Observatory 
Private observatory of Robert Linderholm (1933–2013); it discovered the following asteroids:

Mount Nyukasa Station 

It has discovered the following asteroids:

Nanyo Observatory 
Nanyo Civil Astronomical Observatory was established in 1986 by the Nanyo Astronomical Lovers Club, located in Nan'yō, Yamagata, Japan. This astronomy society was founded in 1983.

It has discovered the following asteroids:

Oaxaca Observatory 

It has discovered the following asteroids:

Osservatorio Astronomico di Monte Agliale 

It has discovered the following asteroids:

Osservatorio Astronomico di Pianoro 

It has discovered the following asteroids:

Osservatorio Astronomico Sormano 

The Sormano Astronomical Observatory in northern Italy has discovered the asteroid 344581 Albisetti. Previously accredited discoveries have now been reassigned to the various amateur astronomers using the observatory. These include Valter Giuliani, Piero Sicoli, Pierangelo Ghezzi, Francesco Manca, Paolo Chiavenna, Graziano Ventre and Augusto Testa.

Marco Cavagna, was also an observer and discoverer of minor planets at Sormano until his death in 2005. The observatory's 0.5-meter telescope was named in his honor.

Osservatorio Colleverde di Guidonia 
It has discovered the following asteroids:

Rand Observatory 

It has discovered the following asteroids:

Rozhen National Astronomical Observatory 

The Rozhen Observatory has discovered the following asteroids:

Sendai Astronomical Observatory 

It has discovered the following asteroids:

Sunflower Observatory 

It has discovered the following asteroids:

Tenagra II Observatory 

It has discovered the following asteroids:

Tzec Maun Observatory (Mayhill) 

It has discovered the following asteroids:

Uenohara Observatory 

It has discovered the following asteroids:

Uto Observatory 

It has discovered the following asteroids:

Yatsugatake-Kobuchizawa 

It has discovered the following asteroids:

Yorii Observatory 

At Yorii Observatory, Japanese amateur astronomers Masaru Arai and Hiroshi Mori have discovered 45 minor planets (credited by the MPC as per 2016):Scr

Zeno Observatory 
Tom Stafford discovered a number of asteroids since 1997, including 12061 Alena, 12533 Edmond, 13436 Enid, 13688 Oklahoma, at Zeno Observatory (observatory code 727) in Edmond, Oklahoma.

It has discovered the following asteroids:

See also 
 
 List of observatory codes
 
 
 List of near-Earth object observation projects

References

External links 
 Minor planet discoverers (alphabetically)
 Minor planet discoverers (ordered by number of discoveries)
 Reports from Geisei Observatory
 The telescopes at Geisei Observatory
 Marco Cavagna's obituary at the Sormano Observatory website

Science-related lists